Cricket NSW (officially known as the New South Wales Cricket Association) is an Australian sporting association that administers cricket in New South Wales. It is based at the Sydney Olympic Park. The New South Wales Blues, the New South Wales Breakers, the Sydney Thunder and the Sydney Sixers are a part of the association.

History
Cricket NSW was established in 1859. William Tunks and Richard Driver were the inaugural joint secretaries of the association. The current CEO is Lee Germon. The organisation was based next to the Sydney Cricket Ground for decades. However, in 2019 the organisation moved to temporary offices in the Sydney Olympic Park precinct, and in 2022 they moved to a new $50 million state of the art administration, high performance and community facility is built on the north side of the Olympic Park precinct along the Parramatta River.

Board of directors
Cricket NSW is governed by nine directors.
The current members of the board are:

See also

Cricket in New South Wales
Country Cricket New South Wales

References

External links

Cricket governing bodies in Australia
Cric
Cricket in New South Wales
1859 establishments in Australia
Sports organizations established in 1859